SkyCraft Airplanes was a Light Sport Aircraft manufacturing company based in Orem, Utah.  The company only built one product, the SkyCraft SD-1 Minisport, a single-seat low-wing plane designed in the Czech Republic.

The company debuted the aircraft at 2013 EAA Airventure Oshkosh as a ready-to-fly, S-LSA Certified aircraft. Production of the aircraft began two months prior in May 2013 and was intended to have a revised cockpit, including Dynon SkyView instrumentation.

At the end of May 2014 Skycraft announced that light-sport flight testing had been completed. However, as of 7 August 2017 the SD-1 was still not on the Federal Aviation Administration's list of accepted light-sport aircraft and by the end of 2017 the company had gone out of businesses.

Aircraft
SkyCraft SD-1 Minisport

References

External links
 

Defunct aircraft manufacturers of the United States
American companies established in 2012
Companies based in Orem, Utah
Defunct manufacturing companies based in Utah
2012 establishments in Utah
Manufacturing companies based in Utah
Manufacturing companies established in 2012
Aircraft manufacturers